Uhaitz or Ugaitz is a Basque word meaning 'torrential river'.  It may refer to:

Rivers 
 Uhaitza or Uhaitz Handia 'big torrent', vernacular name of the Saison
 Uhaitxa (pronounced ), river of Sainte-Engrâce, Pyrénées-Atlantiques, France
 Uhaitza (Uraitza, Uhaitxe), river in Pagolle
 Uhaitz or Uhatz, brook in Ascain, Pyrénées-Atlantiques, France
 Uhaitz-zubi, a tributary of the Estang that rises in Jatxou

See also
 Ugarre, brooks in Larrau and Esterençuby
 Uharka, brook in Sare
 Uharratea (Uharatia), tributary of the Otsarteko erreka in Iholdy
 Ugartzan, Uhartzane, a hamlet of the commune of Ossès, Lower Navarre, Pyrénées-Atlantiques, France